F.L.M. is the only studio album by British pop duo Mel and Kim, released on 13 April 1987 by Supreme Records. The album peaked at number three on the UK Albums Chart and has been certified platinum by the British Phonographic Industry (BPI). It also reached the top five in Australia, Finland and Switzerland, the 10 in Norway and the top 20 in Germany, the Netherlands and Sweden. Three successful singles are included on the album: "Showing Out" (number three on the UK Singles Chart), "Respectable" (number one) and "F.L.M." (number seven).

In the United Kingdom, the vinyl LP was issued with either a full colour or monochrome sleeve. US, Canadian, and Japanese pressings had a different sleeve design and track running order to other international releases. In addition, "Feel a Whole Lot Better" was retitled "Whatever It Is" for these territories.

The album was predominantly written and produced by Stock Aitken Waterman, and contained a mixture of house-infused productions and downtempo, soulful songs. One track, "I'm the One Who Really Loves You", was originally recorded in 1986 by Austin Howard. This song was considered for release as the fourth single, however, it was only released in South Africa and North America where it was issued with remixes by Clivillés & Cole.

Supreme Records head Nick East said the original plan was to release "every track" from the album as a single, "like [Michael Jackson's] Thriller", however Mel's cancer diagnosis forced the abandonment of the plan.

Two other songs from F.L.M. would go on to be recorded by other Stock Aitken Waterman-produced artists; "More Than Words Can Say", which was only released as a single in Scandinavia, was also recorded by Carol Hitchcock and Hazell Dean, while Sinitta and Pepsi and Shirlie both recorded reworked versions of album closer, "Who's Gonna Catch You".

A two-disc deluxe edition of the album was released in 2010, including the duo's 1988 single "That's the Way It Is", and its B-side, "You Changed My Life", which were not included on the original release of the album, as well as 7″ mixes and extended versions of singles and album tracks.

Track listing
Side one
 "F.L.M." – 3:55
 "Showing Out (Get Fresh at the Weekend)" – 5:11
 "Respectable" – 5:41
 "Feel a Whole Lot Better" aka "Whatever It Is" – 4:24
Side two
 "I'm the One Who Really Loves You" – 3:40
 "More Than Words Can Say" – 4:08
 "System" – 4:08
 "From a Whisper to a Scream" – 3:24
 "Who's Gonna Catch You" – 3:34
CD bonus tracks
 "Showing Out" (Freehold mix) – 4:36
 "Respectable" (Extra Beats version instrumental) – 6:11

All songs written by Stock Aitken Waterman, except "Who's Gonna Catch You" written by Matt Aitken / Mike Stock / Pete Waterman / Stevie Wonder / Yvonne Wright, and "From a Whisper to a Scream" lyrics by A & A.

2010 reissue
The album was reissued as a double CD in the United Kingdom through Cherry Red Records on 18 October 2010. Notably, the first three tracks are the 7" mixes, not the album versions contained on the original release.

Disc one
"F.L.M." (7" version) – 3:33
"Showing Out" (7" version) – 3:35
"Respectable" (7" version) – 3:22
"Feel a Whole Lot Better" – 4:27
"I'm the One Who Really Loves You" – 3:41
"More Than Words Can Say" – 4:09
"System" – 4:09
"From a Whisper to a Scream" – 3:25
"Who's Gonna Catch You?" – 3:35
"That's the Way It Is" – 3:27
"You Changed My Life" – 3:27
"Showing Out (Get Fresh at the Weekend)" (extended version) – 7:15
"Respectable" (extended version) – 6:14
"F.L.M." (extended version) – 7:50
"That's the Way It Is" (extended version) – 6:49
"System" (previously unreleased alternative mix) – 3:58
"More Than Words Can Say" (previously unreleased extended version) – 6:50

Disc two
"Respectable" (Extra Beats Vocal) – 8:09
"F.L.M." (Two Grooves Under One Nation Remix) – 8:13
"I'm the One Who Really Loves You" (Yoyo's 12" Mix – previously unreleased) – 6:43
"That's the Way It Is" (Acid House Remix) – 7:38
"System" (garage vocal – previously Unreleased) – 7:22
"Feel a Whole Lot Better" (Yoyo's 12" Mix – previously unreleased) – 7:38
"Showing Out (Get Fresh at the Weekend)" (The Mortgage Mix) – 6:26
"That's the Way It Is" (House Remix) – 6:42
"Respectable" (Shop Mix) – 6:17
"F.L.M." (Sonic Remix) – 6:20
"System" (original 12" mix – previously unreleased) – 5:45

Charts

Weekly charts

Year-end charts

Certifications

References

Bibliography

 

1987 debut albums
Albums produced by Stock Aitken Waterman
Mel and Kim albums